WTSN-CD, virtual and UHF digital channel 20, is a low-powered, Class A Antenna TV-affiliated television station licensed to Evansville, Indiana, United States. The station is owned by Three Sisters Broadcasting, as part of a duopoly with WYYW-CD (channel 15).

WAZE-TV originally occupied its digital signal on UHF channel 20 just before that station shut down permanently in 2011.

History

The low-powered channel 20 was founded on September 22, 2011, as WYYW-CD, and became a MeTV affiliate two months later. This happened three weeks after CBS affiliate WEVV-TV began broadcasting Fox network programming on its second digital subchannel.

On December 12, 2012, WYYW-CD and sister station WTSN-CD swapped call signs. The original WTSN-CD became WYYW-CD, while the original WYYW-CD became WTSN-CD.

The station became a Heroes & Icons (H&I) affiliate on October 23, 2014, while MeTV relocated to WFIE-DT3; five days later, MeTV moved to WFIE-DT2. Then on January 17, 2015, WTSN replaced its Heroes and Icons affiliation with Heartland's E/I programming repeats from its sister station on Saturday mornings because of its Sunday religious and local programming up until the Heartland affiliation with WYYW-CD ended.

On October 25, 2019, WTSN dropped the H&I affiliation, replacing it with Antenna TV.

Digital channels
The station's digital signal is multiplexed:

References

External links
WTSN webpage

TSN-CD
Heroes & Icons affiliates
Antenna TV affiliates
Television channels and stations established in 2011
Low-power television stations in the United States
2011 establishments in Indiana